The 2000 Seve Trophy took place 14–16 April on The Old Course at Sunningdale Golf Club in Berkshire, England. The team captain for Great Britain and Ireland was Colin Montgomerie, with the captain for Continental Europe being Seve Ballesteros. The inaugural competition was won by Continental Europe. The event was officially called "The Eurobet Seve Ballesteros Trophy".

Format 
The teams competed over three days with four fourball matches on both Friday and Saturday, four foursomes matches on Saturday afternoon, four greensomes matches on Sunday morning and ten singles on Sunday.

Each member of the winner team received €150,000, the losing team €90,000 each, giving a total prize fund of €2,400,000.

Teams 
Mark James, who qualified by finishing 18th on the 1999 European Tour Order of Merit, turned down the chance to play for Team Great Britain and Ireland and was replaced by David Howell.

Source:

Day one
Friday, 14 April 2000

Morning foursomes

Source:

Afternoon fourball

Source:

Day two
Saturday, 15 April 2000

Morning fourball

Source:

Day three
Sunday, 16 April 2000

Morning greensomes
The greensomes were due to be played on Saturday afternoon but were delayed by rain and played on Sunday morning before the singles matches.

Source:

Singles

Source:

References

External links
Coverage on the European Tour's official site

Seve Trophy
Golf tournaments in England
Seve Trophy
Seve Trophy
Seve Trophy